The Grahame-White G.W.E.6 Bantam was a British single-seat sporting biplane, designed by M Boudot and built by Grahame-White Aviation Company at Hendon.

General Arrangement

trying  to paste a photo in here

Development
The Bantam was a conventional biplane powered by a nose-mounted 80 hp (60 kW) Le Rhône rotary engine with a single open cockpit. Two aircraft took part in the 1919 Aerial Derby at Hendon Aerodrome, but neither finished the race. A third example was flown in South Africa in the 1920s.

Specifications

* Service ceiling: 17,000 ft
 Rate of climb: 1,100 ft/min

Notes

References

 Contemporary technical description with photographs and drawings.
“The birthplace of aerial power”, Authors: Claude Grahame-White & Harry Harper. June

External links

1910s British sport aircraft
Biplanes
Single-engined tractor aircraft
Aircraft first flown in 1919
Rotary-engined aircraft